Patrick St. Esprit (born May 18, 1954) is an American character actor, best known for playing tough, authoritative roles such as Romulus Thread in The Hunger Games: Catching Fire, Elliot Oswald in Sons of Anarchy and LAPD Commander Robert Hicks in S.W.A.T.

Partial filmography

TV

Film

Video games

References

External links

 

1954 births
Living people
American male film actors
American male television actors
20th-century American male actors
21st-century American male actors